North Central High School may refer to one of many high school in the United States:

North Central High School (Farmersburg, Indiana)
North Central High School (Indianapolis)

North Central High School (Louisiana), Lebeau, Louisiana
North Central High School (Rocklake, North Dakota), Rocklake, North Dakota
North Central High School (Rogers, North Dakota), Rogers, North Dakota
North Central High School (Pioneer, Ohio)
North Central High School (Kershaw, South Carolina)
North Central High School (Spokane, Washington)